Kaijudo is a 2012 American animated series and trading card game that serve as a spin-off and relaunch of the Japanese Duel Masters franchise. The animated series was produced by Hasbro Studios, animated by Moi Animation in South Korea, and developed by Henry Gilroy and Andrew R. Robinson for Wizards of the Coast.

Previously, Hasbro Entertainment licensed and produced an English-language adaptation of the 2002 Duel Masters anime series with Plastic Cow Productions in 2004, as well as an American-exclusive second season, Duel Masters: Sacred Lands, with Elastic Media Corporation. Wizards of the Coast also launched the companion Duel Masters Trading Card Game in the United States in the same year; the series would eventually be discontinued in 2006.

Kaijudo premiered on the Hub Network, a joint venture between Hasbro and Discovery, on June 2, 2012. The companion trading card game was issued by Wizards of the Coast and first released on June 26, 2012. The franchise was discontinued in 2014, with the TV series cancelled after its second season.

Plot

The series follows the adventures of a teenage boy named Ray Okamoto from San Campion who possesses the rare ability to summon and duel alongside fantastical creatures from a parallel dimension. Ray and his two best friends Allie and Gabe join the ranks of the mysterious Duel Masters to ensure the survival of both races.

Episodes

Home media
Shout! Factory began releasing the series in December 2012.  United Kingdom-based Clear Vision has rights for the first two seasons through Region 2, including most of Western Europe and the Middle East.

References

External links
 

2012 American television series debuts
2013 American television series endings
2010s American animated television series
Martial arts television series
Hasbro franchises
Shogakukan franchises
Television series by Hasbro Studios
Digital collectible card games
American children's animated action television series
American children's animated adventure television series
American children's animated science fantasy television series
Anime-influenced Western animated television series
Anime and manga terminology
English-language television shows
Discovery Family original programming
Teen animated television series